The Royal Palm Hotel was a large resort hotel built by railroad magnate Henry Flagler in Miami, Florida. Opened on January 16, 1897, the Royal Palm Hotel was one of the first hotels in the Miami area. It sat on the north bank of the Miami River where it overlooked Biscayne Bay. Five stories tall with a sixth-floor salon, the Royal Palm Hotel featured the city's first electric lights, elevators and swimming pool. Almost thirty years later, The Royal Palm Hotel was grievously damaged by the 1926 hurricane, and infested with termites. In 1930, it was condemned and torn down.

The hotel was built on the site of a Tequesta village. A large mound was removed to make way for the hotel veranda. Between 50 and 60 skulls were found in the mound, and tossed into barrels and sinkholes. Some were later given away as souvenirs. Construction crews also removed evidence of the Spanish mission and slave plantation that existed on the site decades earlier.

The hotel stretched  along the Miami River's north bank. A veranda surrounded the hotel, about one-sixth of a mile in length. The hotel was described as "modern Colonial", with an air of "decorous opulence". There were 450 guest rooms and suites. The average guest room was twelve feet by eighteen feet, and 100 of the rooms had private baths. The main dining room would seat 500 guests. A second dining room was for maids and children. There were also private dining rooms. The boiler room, electric plant, kitchens, laundry and ice-makers were in a separate building. The hotel had a staff of 300, including sixteen cooks. Although, at the insistence of Julia Tuttle, a clause prohibiting the sale of alcoholic beverages had been included in all land deeds for the new city of Miami, the Royal Palm Hotel had an exemption to serve alcohol to its guests during the three months of the tourist season.

See also
 Metropolitan Miami (development), covering most of the site today
 DuPont Plaza Hotel (Miami), built on the southern portion of the site in 1957, replaced by the EPIC Miami Residences and Hotel in 2008

References

Further reading
 $100 buys you a brick of hotel built by Flagler - Retrieved July 6, 2007
 Archaeologists hurry to excavate remains of Henry Flagler hotel in Miami - Retrieved July 6, 2007

Hotel buildings completed in 1897
Buildings and structures demolished in 1930
Demolished hotels in Florida
Florida East Coast Railway
History of Miami
Railway hotels in the United States
Demolished buildings and structures in Miami